Konstantinos Kallokratos was a teacher and a poet.

He was born in Veroia in 1589. He was a student at the Greek College of Ayios Athanasios in Rome between 1600 and 1610. There, he studied philosophy and theology. Later he taught at a school in Calabria. His bosom friend was Leo Allatius. Konstantinos Kallokratos was a brilliant man and a skilled poet.

See also
List of Macedonians (Greek)

External links
List of Great Macedonians (15th-19th century)

See also
Byzantine scholars in Renaissance

1589 births
17th-century deaths
People from Veria
Greek educational theorists
Greek Renaissance humanists
Macedonia under the Ottoman Empire
16th-century Greek people
17th-century Greek people
Greek Macedonians
17th-century Greek educators
Pontifical Greek College of Saint Athanasius alumni
Emigrants from the Ottoman Empire to Italy